The 9th National Assembly of the Federal Republic of Nigeria is a bicameral legislature inaugurated on 11 June 2019 and will run its course until 11 June 2023.

Principal Officers

Senate

Presiding officers

Majority leadership

Minority leadership

House

Presiding officers

Majority leadership

Minority leadership

Members
House
Senate

Notes

References

Politics of Nigeria
9th
Nigeria
2019 in Nigerian politics